In basketball, a block (short for blocked shot) occurs when a defender deflects or stops a field goal attempt without committing a foul. The National Collegiate Athletic Association's (NCAA) Division I players on this list all accomplished the rare feat of blocking 13 shots in a single game. The 1985–86 season was the first that statistics on blocks were first compiled by the NCAA.

The highest single game block total by one player in NCAA Division I men's basketball history is 16, set by Mickell Gladness of Alabama A&M on February 24, 2007 against Texas Southern. Although Gladness holds the single-game record, it is Jarvis Varnado of Mississippi State who claims the all-time career blocked shots record (564). Varnado never blocked 13 or more shots in a game, however. Through the 2015–16 season, only 18 different players have reached the 13-block mark. Among them, Gladness is the only player to have reached 16 blocks, nobody has blocked 15, five players have reached 14, and twelve players have hit 13 blocks.

David Robinson once blocked 14 shots in a game while playing for Navy, and is the only player on this list to be inducted into the Naismith Memorial Basketball Hall of Fame.

In the era before blocks were officially tracked by the entire NCAA, on December 3, 1983, Hakeem Olajuwon blocked 16 shots in a game while playing for the University of Houston against Biscayne.  The blocks are a school record and would have tied the NCAA Division I record.  Like Robinson, Olajuwon has also been inducted into the Basketball Hall of Fame.

In the 1950s Bill Russell's shot-blocking ability was touted in his junior and senior year, but there were no official statistics of blocks then and scant film of survives from his college career. However, film exists of his final game as a college player, in which his University of San Francisco team clinched the NCAA championship for the second year in a row to cap an undefeated season, and Russell is unofficially credited with 20 blocked shots in that game (to go with 26 points and 27 rebounds, a double-triple-double).

Key

Dates of 13+ blocks

See also
List of National Basketball Association players with most blocks in a game

References
General

Specific

NCAA Division I men's basketball statistical leaders